Christian Family Radio is a network of Christian radio stations based in Bowling Green, Kentucky. The network is owned by Christian Family Media Ministries, Inc., a non-profit organization that is funded by listener contributions and underwriting grants from businesses.

CFR operates its flagship station, WCVK, out of its Bowling Green facilities. It also operates WJVK, a full-power repeater station in Owensboro, Kentucky, and WZVK, also a full-power repeater in Glasgow, Kentucky, both of which simulcasts the WCVK signal.

External links
Official web site

American radio networks